Radmilo Kostić is a politician in Serbia. He has served in the National Assembly of Serbia since 2012 as a member of the Serbian Progressive Party.

Early life and career
Kostić was born in Pirot, then part of the Socialist Republic of Serbia in the Socialist Federal Republic of Yugoslavia. He is a graduate economist and is president of the Progressive Party committee in Pirot District.

Parliamentarian
Kostić received the eighty-ninth position on the Progressive Party's Let's Get Serbia Moving electoral list in the 2012 Serbian parliamentary election. He missed direct election when the list won seventy-three mandates; he was, however, able to enter the assembly on October 30, 2012, as a replacement for Marija Blečić, who had resigned to take a government position. The Progressive Party became the dominant party in a coalition government after the election, and Kostić served as part of its parliamentary majority. He was re-elected in the 2014 and 2016 elections, both of which saw the Progressives and their allies win majority victories.

Kostić is currently a member of the parliamentary committee on finance, state budget, and control of public spending; and a member of the parliamentary friendship groups with Greece and Japan.

References

1971 births
Living people
Members of the National Assembly (Serbia)
People from Pirot
Serbian Progressive Party politicians